2018 Hokkaido Consadole Sapporo season.

Squad
As of 14 January 2018.

Out on loan

J1 League

League table

Match details

References

External links
 J.League official site

Hokkaido Consadole Sapporo
Hokkaido Consadole Sapporo seasons